Somerset High School is a continuation school located in Bellflower, California, as part of the Bellflower Unified School District (BUSD).

As of 2004, Somerset had 17 regular educations teachers and 16 classrooms serving 353 students from the communities of Lakewood and Bellflower.  Average class size is 12.7 students.

Demographics

Special Services
This school serves students that were referred from the other high schools in the district.  Special services on this campus are a regional occupation program center and a child care facility for children of teen mothers.

References

External links
 
 

High schools in Los Angeles County, California
Bellflower, California
Continuation high schools in California
Public high schools in California